A Bendix drive is a type of engagement mechanism used in starter motors of internal combustion engines. The device allows the pinion gear of the starter motor to engage or disengage the ring gear (which is attached to the flywheel or flexplate of the engine) automatically when the starter is powered or when the engine fires, respectively. It is named after its inventor, Vincent Hugo Bendix.

Operation

The Bendix system places the starter drive pinion on a helical drive spring. When the starter motor begins turning, the inertia of the drive pinion assembly causes it to wind the spring forcing the length of the spring to change, and allowing the pinion to engage with the ring gear. When the engine starts, backdrive from the ring gear causes the drive pinion to exceed the rotative speed of the starter, at which point the drive pinion is forced back and out of mesh with the ring gear.

The main drawback to the Bendix drive is that it relies on a certain amount of "clash" between the teeth of the pinion and the ring gears before they slip into place and mate completely; the teeth of the pinion are already spinning when they come into contact with the static ring gear, and unless they happen to align perfectly at the moment they engage, the pinion teeth will strike the teeth of the ring gear side-to-side rather than face-to-face, and continue to rotate until both align. This increases wear on both sets of teeth. For this reason the Bendix drive has been largely superseded in starter motor design by the pre-engagement system using a starter solenoid.

References

Internal combustion engine
Engines
Bendix Corporation